Ommeganck may refer to:

 Balthasar Paul Ommeganck (1755–1826), Flemish painter
 Maria Jacoba Ommeganck (1760–1849), Flemish painter
 Ommegang, generic name for various Low Countries medieval pageants